Yasemin Ecem Anagöz (born 14 October 1998) is a Turkish recurve archer.

Anagöz represented her country at the 2015 European Games in Baku, Azerbaijan. She competed in the individual recurve event and the team recurve event at the 2015 World Archery Championships in Copenhagen, Denmark.

She won the bronze medal in the Junior Mixed Team event with her teammate Mete Gazoz at the 2017 World Archery Youth Championships in Rosario, Santa Fe, Argentina. In 2018, she won the European Championships in Legnica, beating Denmark's Maja Jager in the final, and added another gold in the women's team event.

She won the silver medal in the women's team recurve event at the 2022 European Archery Championships held in Munich, Germany.

References

External links

 
 

Turkish female archers
Living people
1998 births
Archers at the 2014 Summer Youth Olympics
Archers at the 2015 European Games
European Games competitors for Turkey
Olympic archers of Turkey
Archers at the 2016 Summer Olympics
Competitors at the 2018 Mediterranean Games
Competitors at the 2022 Mediterranean Games
Mediterranean Games gold medalists for Turkey
Mediterranean Games bronze medalists for Turkey
Mediterranean Games medalists in archery
Archers at the 2019 European Games
Archers at the 2020 Summer Olympics
20th-century Turkish sportswomen
21st-century Turkish sportswomen
Islamic Solidarity Games medalists in archery